Ethnic Bulgarians in present-day Albania live mostly in the areas of Mala Prespa, Gollobordë and Gora. According to the Bulgarian State Agency for Bulgarians Abroad, 40,000 to 50,000 persons of Bulgarian origin are living in Albania. Ethnic identity can be fluid among the Albania's Slavophonic population, who might identify as Albanian, Bulgarian or Macedonian, depending on the circumstances. Between 2001 and 2016, around 4,470 Albanian nationals applied for a Bulgarian citizenship and over 2,600 of them were granted one. The Bulgarian minority was recognized by the Albanian government in October 2017.

History

Middle Ages and Ottoman period

The first reference to a Slavic presence in Albania dates to 548, when the Slavs reached Epidamnos (Durrës), capturing fortresses in the city's vicinity. Slavic settlement near Epirus in southern Albania is mentioned in a note in a 10th-century manuscript of Strabo's Geographica, and near Durrës in a Middle Bulgarian translation of the Manasses Chronicle.

Archaeologists have suggested the existence of a Bulgar archaeological culture in what is now modern Macedonia and eastern Albania, citing fortresses, burials, various products of metallurgy and pottery that could be of Bulgar origin.

According to toponymic evidence, Slavic settlement was concentrated in the region between the Vjosë and Devoll Rivers. Slavic placenames in this region suggest an eastern South Slavic (i.e. Bulgarian, as opposed to Serbo-Croatian) dialect. Bulgarian Slavs remained a significant group in central and southern Albania through the 15th century. In the 850s and 860s, Simeon I's First Bulgarian Empire included the Slavic-inhabited areas of what is today western Macedonia and southern Albania, which constituted the Kutmichevitsa administrative province. Kutmichevista included the cities of Ohrid, Glavinitsa (Ballsh), Belgrad (Berat) and Devoll (at the village of Zvezdë). The Bulgarian enlighteners Clement of Ohrid and Naum of Preslav are known to have worked in Kutmichevitsa, where according to the 11th-century account of Theophylact of Bulgaria, Clement had 3,500 students. Clement's and Naum's activity, as well as the consolidation of Bulgarian religious and state authority, helped establish the Bulgarian identity of this Slavic population.

From 989-995 to 1005, Albania was ruled by Samuel of Bulgaria. Under Samuel's rule, the region was governed by Ivan Vladimir, his vassal and the husband of his daughter Kosara. In 1005, the area was reconquered by the Byzantine Empire. While the area was under Byzantine rule, a Bulgarian leader named Tihomir headed an uprising against the Byzantines near Drach; he was first supported but then killed by another insurgent, Peter Delyan, who proceeded to head the uprising and briefly ruled much of Albania, Macedonia, Serbia and western Bulgaria. In 1078, Nikephoros Vassilaki raised an army from the area surrounding Drach, consisting of "Franks (who came from Italy), Bulgarians, Romans (i.e. Byzantine Greeks) and Arvanites (i.e. Albanians)"

The area fell under Bulgarian rule again between 1231 and 1240, under Ivan Asen II, who "routed the Greek army ... and conquered the entire Greek, Albanian and Serbian land from Odrin [Edirne] to Drach." John Kukuzelis, a famous medieval composer of Bulgarian descent, was born in the city in the late 13th century. During the Angevin period (1250–1350), the Slavic population lived mainly in the cities and villages near the sea, along the Drin River and in the vicinity of Lake Ohrid.

Francois Pouqueville, in his 1820 book Travels in Epirus, Albania, Macedonia, and Thessaly described Bulgarian villages in the Devol region.

20th century
In the 1920s, Albanians referred to orthodox Slavs in Albania as Bulgarians. In 1932, Bulgaria and Albania signed a protocol regarding the recognition of the ethnic Bulgarian minority in Albania. However it was not ratified by the Albanian side due to a pressure from Yugoslavia. The recognition would involve Albania deeper in the conflict between Sofia and Belgrade on the Macedonian Slavs. In Albanian Macedonia, were strong bulgarophile sentiments and the pro-Bulgarian, paramilitary Internal Macedonian Revolutionary Organization had its bases, from where it launched attacks into the Kingdom of Yugoslavia. Belgrade was suspicious of the recognition of a Bulgarian minority there and was annoyed this would hinder its policy of forced “Serbianisation” in Serbian Macedonia. It had already blocked the ratification of similar protocol with Greece. The protocol caused a severe reaction in the Kingdom of Yugoslavia. As result Albanian side was convinced that opposing to Belgrade over this problem was not in its interest. Albanian-Bulgarian relations deteriorated completely during 1933 because in March 150 Bulgarian families were deported from the villages of Gorna and Dolna Gorica. The Bulgarian chargé d'affaires in Tirana informed his government that the plan of the Albanian government was to see all Bulgarians out of the country. The Albanian-Italian census in today western parts of North Macedonia, then part of Albanian Kingdom, and today most eastern parts of Albania, conducted in October 1942, a total of 234,783 people living on this territory. According to the reported results for the ethnic composition of this population, the most recorded were Albanians - 61% of the total, 31% from registered were Bulgarians and 8% were recorded as Serbs.

Acknowledgement of the Bulgarian minority
The people in Albania who have preserved their Bulgarian ethnic identity are an important testimony to the truth about the historical past of the country as well as the geographical region of Macedonia. Therefore, in the context of the integration process of Albania's accession to the EU, Bulgaria naturally insists on the equality of Bulgarians in Albania with the other minority ethnic groups according to the country's practice and legislation in this area, i.e. the official recognition of a Bulgarian minority along with other officially recognized minorities.

The Bulgarian community is one of the most endangered, due to two main reasons:

 Unlike other communities that are compact, the Bulgarian one is mainly in three different regions that are not adjacent to each other. These are Gollobordë, Gora and Prespa, where the population is spread in small villages, in one of the poorest eastern regions of Albania;
 The Bulgarian community varies in religion. In Prespa the Orthodox Christians prevail, in Gollobordë the community is mixed, while in Gora, the Muslims are a majority. These factors contribute to the specific status of the Bulgarian community in Albania as endangered and strengthen its need of national recognition.

Although the 1989 Albanian census recorded 782 people who claimed either Romanian, Czechoslovakian or Bulgarian nationality, The Albanian statistics institute denies the existence of a Bulgarian minority in Albania. In 1998 Paskal Milo, then the Foreign Minister of Albania, made the following statement on minorities: "After World War II, we know this minority as Macedonian. I’d rather not elaborate on why we chose this way, but the Communist regime made this decision and it’s difficult for us now to change that." 

The Bulgarian government and some inhabitants of the Mala Prespa, Gollobordë and Gora regions dispute this.

Two organisations for Bulgarians in Albania exist: "Prosperitet — Golo Brdo" and the cultural association "Ivan Vazov" in Mala Prespa. More than 800 Albanian citizens of Bulgarian descent have acquired Bulgarian passports based on claims of Bulgarian origin.

According to Macedonian authorities, the Slav minority of Albania consists only of ethnic Macedonians and not Bulgarians. In 2008, the Bulgarian government reported that it had reached an agreement with the Albanian government that forms in Albania's next census would allow the Bulgarian community in the country to be counted. In 2011, Bulgaria's Finance Minister, who is responsible for relations with the Bulgarian diaspora, met with members of the Bulgarian community in Albania, announcing that a Bulgarian cultural center would be opened in Tirana

On 15.02.2017 the EU parliament for the first time in its 2016 Annual Progress Report on Albania, called on the country to recognize the Bulgarian minority in the country.

The official text of the report says: Notes that further efforts are needed to protect the rights of all minorities in Albania, through the full implementation of the relevant legislation; recommends that the rights of people with Bulgarian ethnicity in the Prespa, Gollobordë and Gora regions be enshrined in law and ensured in practice;

On 12.10.2017 the Albanian parliament recognized by law the Bulgarian minority in Mala Prespa, Gollobordë and Gora.

Macedonian organizations and activists deny the existence of local Bulgarians in Albania and present their Bulgarian self-determination as caused by a desire to obtain a Bulgarian passport. After Bulgaria's accession to the European Union, Bulgarians can travel visa-free to the EU.

See also
 Macedonian Question
 Albania under the Bulgarian Empire
 Ballshi inscription
 Gorani (ethnic group)
 Macedonians of Albania
 Macedonians (Bulgarians)

References and notes

 
 

Ethnic groups in Albania
Albania
Albania